Myra Wood is a lawn bowls international from the United States.

Biography
Wood began bowling in 1986 and represented the United States from 1994 to 2015. She won a fours silver medal (with Janice Bell, Anne Nunes and Candy DeFazio) at the 2015 Asia Pacific Bowls Championships in Christchurch, New Zealand.

In 2017, she was inducted into the United States Bowls Hall of Fame. This was the same year in which she won the USA National pairs title with Lorriane Hitchcock.

References

Living people
American female bowls players
Year of birth missing (living people)
21st-century American women